Harald von Boehmer (30 November 1942 – 24 June 2018) was a German-Swiss immunologist best known for his work on T lymphocytes.

Career 
The youngest of Hasso von Boehmer's three children, von Boehmer obtained an M.D. from the Ludwig Maximilian University of Munich (1968) and a Ph.D. from Melbourne University, Australia (1974). He was a member of the Basel Institute for Immunology in Switzerland (1973–1996), director of Unité INSERM 373 at the René Descartes University in Paris, France and is Professor of Pathology at Harvard Medical School and the Faculty of Arts and Sciences of Harvard University, Cambridge and Chief of the Laboratory for Lymphocyte Biology at the Dana Farber Cancer Institute in Boston. He was an adjunct professor at the University of Florida.
	
Von Boehmer studied the role of T lymphocytes in the immune system. In particular he addressed the contribution of the T cell receptor (TCR) to recognition by T cells of  peptide-MHC complexes by transfer of TCR alpha and beta genes from one T cell clone to another. Questions concerned with the role of positive and negative selection of developing T cells by peptide-MHC complexes in the thymus in generating an effective and self-tolerant immune system were analyzed in TCR transgenic mice. The same experimental system served the purpose to study the impact of TCR-ligation on developing T cells by MHC class I and MHC class II ligands on the intrathymic generation of CD8 killer and CD4 helper cells, respectively. Further studies were concerned with the structure and function of the pre-T cell receptor and its role in controlling survival and differentiation of developing T cells that have succeeded in productive TCR beta rearrangement. Harald von Boehmer studied the generation and function of regulatory T cells that have an essential role in preventing autoimmunity with the goal to exploit these cells in the prevention of and interference with unwanted immune reactions.

Harald von Boehmer was elected as a Senior Member of the Institut Universitaire de France (1997), was awarded the Louis-Jeantet Prize for Medicine jointly with Nicole Le Douarin and Gottfried Schatz in Geneva (1990) and received an honorary Medical Degree from the University of Technology, Munich (2002).

Harald von Boehmer retired at the end of 2012 and was a guest professor at the Institute for Immunology of Ludwig Maximilian University of Munich beginning January 2013.

In February 2013 Harald von Boehmer, MD, PhD, Professor of Microbiology and Immunology at the Department of Cancer Immunology & AIDS, Harvard Medical School (USA), did receive the Helmholtz International Fellow Award for having excelled in the field of Immunology.

Von Boehmer died on June 24, 2018, at the age of 75.

Awards 
 1990 Louis Jeantet Prize for Medicine (Geneva)
 1990 Elected member of the Academia Europaea (London)
 1990 Avery-Landsteiner-Prize of the German society for immunology (Aachen)
 1993 Paul Ehrlich and Ludwig Darmstaedter Prize (Frankfurt)
 1997 Körber European Science Prize (Hamburg)
 1997 Elected member of the Institut Universitaire de France
 2002 Honorary doctor in Medical degree of the Technical University of Munich
 2003 Elected member of the German Academy of Sciences Leopoldina (Halle)
 2003 National Institutes of Health NIH Merit Award (Washington D.C.)
 2004 Sherman Fairchild Foundation award
 2013 Helmholtz International Fellow Award

Selected publications
Selected papers from

 von Boehmer, H., Sprent, J. and Nabholz, M..: Tolerance to histocompatibility determinants in tetraparental bone marrow chimeras. J. Exp. Med. 141, 322 (1975). Graft-versus-host disease-free allogeneic bone marrow transplantation after T cell removal (used later to cure human immunodeficiency).
 von Boehmer, H., Hudson, L. and Sprent, J.: Collaboration of histo-incompatible T and B lymphocytes using cells from tetraparental bone manow chimeras. J. Exp. Med. 1421989 (1975); von Boehmer, H. and Haaso W.: Cytotoxic T lymphocytes recognize allogeneic toleruted, TNP-conjugated cells. Nature 261, 141 (1976). Allo-MHC-restricted CD4 and CD8 T cells in hemopoietic chimeras reveal plasticity of MHC-restricted antigen recognition.
 Dembic, Z., Haas, W., Weiss, S., McCubrey, J., Kiefer, H., von Boehmer, H. and Steinmetz, M.: Transfer of specificity by marine alpha and beta T cell receptor genes. Nature 329, 232 (1986). Transfer of alpha and beta TCR genes shows MHC-restricted antigen recognition by a single receptor.
 Kisielow, P., Blüthmann, H., Staerz, U. D., Steinmetz, M. and von Boehmer, H.: Tolerance in T cell receptor transgenic mice: deletion of nonmatare CD4+8+ thymoqttes. Nature 333, 742-746 (1988); Swat, W., Ignatowicz, L., von Boehmer, H. and Kisielow, P.: Clonal deletion of immature CD4+8+ thymocytes in suspension culture by extrathymic antigen-presenting cells. Nature 351, 150 (1991). Central tolerance by deletion of immature T cells in TCR transgenic mice.
 Teho H. S., Kisielow, P., Scott, 8., Kishi, H., Uematsu, Y., Blüthmann, H. and von Boehmer, H.: Thymic MHC antigens and the specfficity of the ap T cell receptor determine the CD4/CD6 phenotype of T cells. Nature 335, 229 (1988); Scott, 8., Blüthmann, H., Teh, H. S. and von Boehmer, H.: The generation of mature T cells requires an interaction of the alpha beta T cell receptor with major histocompatibility antigens. Nature 338, 591 (1989). Essential role of T cell receptor-mediated positive selection in T cell survival and lineage fate (CD4/8) determination.
 Rocha, B. and von Boehmer, H.: Peripheral selection of the T cell repertoire. Science 251, 1225 (1991). Peripheral tolerance by deletion of and reversible anergy in matureT cells.
 Borgulya, P., Kishi, H., Uematsu, Y. and von Boehmer, H.: Exclusion and inclusion of alpha and beta T cell receptor alleles. Cell 69, 529 (1992); Aifantis, I., Buer, J., von Boehmer, H. and Azogui, O.: Essential role of the pre-T cell receptor in allelic exclusion of the T cell receptor beta locus. Immunity 7, 601-607 (1997). Pre-TCR-mediated feedback on TCRbeta rearrangement as essential mechanism for TCRbeta allelic exclusion. Lack of TCRalpha allelic exclusion.
 Bruno, L., Kirberg, J. and von Boehmer, H.: On the cellular basis of immunological T cell memory. Immunity 2,37-43 (1995). T cell memory rests with memory cells that differ in phenotype and function from naive T cells and survive in the absence of antigen.
 Groettrup, M., Ungewiss, K., Azogui, O., Palacios, R., Owen, M. J., Hayday, A. C. and von Boehmer, H.: A novel disulfide-linked heterodimer on pre-T cells consists of the T cell receptor beta chain and a 33 kd glycoprotein. Cell 75, 283-294 (1993); Saint-Ruf, C., Ungewiss, K., Groettrup, M., Bruno, L., Fehling, H. J. and von Boehmer, H.: Analysis and expression of a cloned pre-T cell receptor gene. Science 266,1208-1212 (1994); Fehling, H.J., Krotkova, A., Saint-Ruf, C. and von Boehmer, H.: Crucial role of the pre-T cell receptor in development of alpha beta but not gamma delta T cells. Nature 375, 795-798 (1995). Discovery of the pre-TCR. Cloning and targeting of the Ptcra gene.
 Apostolou, I., Sarukhan, A., Klein, L. and von Boehmer, H.: Origin of regulatory T cells with known specificity for antigen. Nat. Immunol. 3, 756-63 (2002); Kretschmer, K., Apostolou, I., Hawiger, D., Khazaie, K-, Nussenzweig, M. C. and von Boehmer, H.: Inducing and expanding regulatory T cells by foreign antigen. Nat. Immunol. 6, 1219-1227 (2005). Marson, A.°, Kretschmer, K.°, Frampton, G. M., Jacobsen, E. S., Polansky, J., MacIsaac, K. D., Levine, S. S., Fraenkel, E., von Boehmer, H., Young, R. A.: Foxp3 occupancy and regulation of key target genes during T-cell stimulation. Nature 445, 931-5 (2007). Antigen-dependent intra- and extra-thymic generation of regulatory T cells and Foxp3-dependent gene regulation.

External links 
 Harald von Boehmer at Cancer Immunology Research
 Harald von Boehmer in Library of Congress , 
  Harald von Boehmer in Deutsche Nationalbibliothek:  and 
 Harald von Boehmer in the library of the University of Freiburg: [Vorr.]

References 

1942 births
2018 deaths
People from Guben
Academic staff of the University of Basel
University of Florida faculty
Harvard Medical School faculty
German immunologists
Swiss immunologists
German untitled nobility
Members of the German Academy of Sciences Leopoldina
German emigrants to Switzerland
Swiss expatriates in France
Swiss expatriates in the United States